Used to Love may refer to:

 "Used to Love" (Keke Wyatt song), released in 2001
 "Used to Love" (Martin Garrix and Dean Lewis song), released in 2019

See also
 Used to Love You (disambiguation)